Azul Conecta, formerly known as TwoFlex Aviação Inteligente, is a domestic and regional airline based in Jundiaí, Brazil, established in 2013.

History
Azul Conecta was formed as TwoFlex on April 1, 2013 as a result of the merger of Two Táxi Aéreo and Flex Aero Táxi Aéreo.

Between August 2016 and June 2019, TwoFlex operated wet lease flights on behalf of Voe Minas Gerais, a State-run project that connected cities within the State of Minas Gerais to the State capital Belo Horizonte. TwoFlex was the only operator for the duration of this program, which was discontinued on June 30, 2019.

In November 2017, Twoflex was granted rights to operate regular feeder passenger flights connecting smaller locations to main cities in all Brazilian territory. At the time, this authorization led to the increase of services provided by Voe Minas Gerais.

Being authorized to operate feeder services nationwide, on April 12, 2019, TwoFlex announced an adapted Essential Air Service partnership with Gol Transportes Aéreos in which TwoFlex would operate feeder services on behalf of Gol in the States of Amazonas, Pará and Mato Grosso. Following the same trend, flights to six locations in Rio Grande do Sul and eleven in Paraná were confirmed.

Another consequence of this authorization was being allowed to bid for slots at São Paulo–Congonhas Airport. On August 14, 2019, the National Civil Aviation Agency of Brazil confirmed that TwoFlex was granted 14 slots at Congonhas but can only operate using the auxiliary runway 17L/35R. TwoFlex plans to connect São Paulo-Congonhas with three cities in São Paulo State and one in Rio de Janeiro State.

On 14 January 2020 Azul Brazilian Airlines signed an agreement to purchase Twoflex. On March 27, 2020 the Brazilian regulatory bodies gave its full permission (nihil obstat) to the purchase and sale of flights started on April 14, 2020. On 11 August 2020 the airline was rebranded as Azul Conecta to reflect its partnership with Azul Brazilian Airlines. It operates feeder services to bases of Azul.

Destinations
As of December 2022, below are destinations marketed by Azul Brazilian Airlines using its platform and operated by Azul Conecta:

a.Although Santana do Livramento (Brazil) is the destination listed, because of operational reasons flights operated at Rivera International Airport located in the twin city Rivera, Uruguay.

Fleet
As of September 2022 the fleet of Azul Conecta included the following aircraft:

Airline affinity program
Azul Conecta accrue benefits as per Azul Brazilian Airlines Frequent Flyer Program program Tudo Azul.

Accidents and incidents
16 September 2019: a Cessna 208 Caravan registration PT-MHC operating a flight from Manaus to Maués, crashed in a wooded area on takeoff.  All ten on board survived the accident. Thunderstorms were present in the area around the time of departure. The aircraft was damaged beyond repair.

See also
List of airlines of Brazil

References

External links
 Facebook page

Airlines of Brazil
Airlines established in 2013
2013 establishments in Brazil